Stardom (stylized as Star;dom) is the sixth extended play from South Korean boy band Up10tion. It was released on June 29, 2017, by TOP Media. The album consists of six tracks, including the lead single "Runner" for which a teaser video was released June 27. A preview video for the songs was released the day before the EP. It marked their first release as nine members with Wooseok on hiatus. At the 32nd Golden Disc Awards the album was nominated in Album Bonsang, and shortlisted the Asia Association Music Prize.

Music video and commercial performance
The music video teasers were released on June 27 and 28, 2017, and it was released alongside the album, as of 2022 the video received 3 million views.

The EP sold 95,963+ copies in South Korea. It peaked at number 1 on the Korean Gaon Chart.

Track listing

References

2017 EPs
Korean-language EPs
Kakao M EPs
Up10tion EPs